Sharon is a town in Litchfield County, Connecticut, United States, in the northwest corner of the state. At the time of the 2020 census, the town had a total population of 2,680. The ZIP code for Sharon is 06069. The urban center of the town is the Sharon census-designated place, with a population of 729 at the 2010 census.

History
The first inhabitants of the area they called Poconnuck were the Mattabesec Native Americans. These were part of what became known as the Wappinger confederacy, which in turn belonged to the loose Algonquian confederacy.

Sharon was incorporated in 1739. It is named after the Plain of Sharon.

Historic sites
Sharon has six sites listed on the U.S. National Register of Historic Places:
Ebenezer Gay House, 18 Main St., Sharon
George King House, 12 N. Main St., Sharon
Gov. Smith Homestead, South Main St., Sharon
James Pardee House, 129 N. Main St., Sharon
Sharon Historic District, roughly Main St. from Low Rd. to its junction with Mitchelltown, Amenia Union, and W. Woods Rds., Sharon
Sharon Valley Historic District

Geography
The town is bounded on the north by Salisbury, on the east across the Housatonic River by Cornwall, on the south by Kent, and on the west by Dutchess County, New York.

It is the 3rd largest town in Connecticut based on area. Sharon is part of the Northwest Highlands of Connecticut, a region in and around the watershed of the Housatonic River. The Appalachian Trail passes for a few miles through the east side of Sharon, near West Cornwall and U.S. Route 7. Housatonic Meadows State Park is in the eastern part of the town, next to the Housatonic River.

Principal communities
Amenia Union
Ellsworth
Sharon center
Sharon Valley
Main Street & Green
Calkinstown
West Woods

Demographics

As of the census of 2000, there were 2,968 people, 1,246 households, and 775 families residing in the town. The racial makeup of the town was 96.87% White, 0.94% African American, 0.57% Asian, 0.44% Native American, 0% Pacific Islander, 0.34% from other races, and 0.84% from two or more races. Hispanic or Latino of any race were 1.95% of the population.

There were 1,246 households, of which 25.8% had children under the age of 18 living with them, 51.9% were married couples living together, 7.5% had a female householder with no husband present, and 37.8% were non-families. 31.1% of all households were made up of individuals, and 13.2% had someone living alone who was 65 years of age or older.  The average household size was 2.26 and the average family size was 2.87.

In the town, the population was spread out, with 21.3% under the age of 18, 4.2% from 18 to 24, 24.4% from 25 to 44, 29.1% from 45 to 64, and 21.0% who were 65 years of age or older. The median age was 45 years. For every 100 females, there were 94.0 males. For every 100 females age 18 and over, there were 92.2 males.

The median household income was $53,000, and the median family income for a family was $71,458. Males had a median income of $42,841 versus $31,375 for females. The per capita income for the town was $45,418. About 3.9% of families and 7.2% of the population were below the poverty line, including 10.4% of those under the age of 18 and none of those 65 and older.

Education

Sharon is a member of Regional School District 01, which also includes the towns of Canaan, Cornwall, Kent, North Canaan, and Salisbury. Public school students attend Sharon Center School from grades K–8 and Housatonic Valley Regional High School from grades 9–12.

Transportation
The town is served by state highways 4, 41, 343, and 361. Route 4 has its western terminus in Sharon and leads southeast  to Cornwall Bridge and ultimately east  to West Hartford.

Notable people

 Kevin Bacon (born 1958), and his wife Kyra Sedgwick (born 1965), actors
 Patricia Buckley Bozell (1927–2008), author and editor; reared in Sharon with her brother William at the Buckley family home, "Great Elm"
 William F. Buckley Jr. (1925–2008), public intellectual, founder of National Review
 Yancy Butler (born 1970), former Witchblade actress
 William Coley (1862–1936), prominent New York bone surgeon and inventor of "Coley's toxins", an early form of cancer immunotherapy
 Jane Curtin (born 1947), actress and comedian
 Michael J. Fox (born 1961) and his wife Tracy Pollan (born 1960), actors
 Frank R. Fratellenico (1951–1970), Medal of Honor recipient, Vietnam War
 Arthur Getz (1913–1996), illustrator for The New Yorker magazine
 Tom Goldenberg (born 1948), artist
 Eunice Groark (1938–2018), Lieutenant Governor of Connecticut 
 Thomas Hart (1877–1971), U.S. Navy admiral and U.S. senator
 Benjamin B. Hotchkiss (1826–1885), ordnance engineer, husband of Maria Bissell Hotchkiss
 Maria Bissell Hotchkiss (1827–1901), educator, wife of Benjamin B. Hotchkiss
 S. Holden Jaffe, musician behind Del Water Gap
 Jasper Johns (born 1930), artist
 Elijah Juckett (1760–1839), Continental Army soldier
 Helen Coley Nauts (1907–2001), daughter of William Coley and co-founder of the Cancer Research Institute
 Sam Posey (born 1944), retired racecar driver and sports broadcaster
 Campbell Scott (born 1961), actor
 Ansel Sterling (1782–1853), congressman from Connecticut
 Charles A. Templeton (1871–1955), Governor of Connecticut
 Bradley Whitford (born 1959) and his wife Jane Kaczmarek (born 1955), actors

Sharon Hospital, the birthplace of several persons who were not residents

 Philip Amelio, 1980s child actor born in Sharon on November 3, 1977; raised in nearby Pine Plains, New York
 Samuel Berger, U.S. National Security Advisor to President Bill Clinton, born in Sharon on October 28, 1945; raised in nearby Millerton, New York
 Michael Cole (born Michael Shawn Coulthard), announcer on WWE Raw and former CBS Radio journalist, born in Sharon on December 8, 1968; raised in nearby Amenia, New York
 Alfred Korzybski, founder of the nearby Institute of General Semantics, died at Sharon Hospital March 1, 1950

References

External links

 Town of Sharon official website
 Sharon Historical Society
  Historic USGS map including Sharon, in the southwest corner of the quadrangle
 1935 description of Sharon
 Mudge Pond, a  lake in the northwest part of Sharon
 Sharon Audubon Center

 
Towns in Litchfield County, Connecticut
Towns in the New York metropolitan area
Towns in Connecticut